James Isaac Neutron is the titular and main character from the film Jimmy Neutron: Boy Genius and its spin-off Nickelodeon computer animated television series The Adventures of Jimmy Neutron, Boy Genius. Created by showrunner John A. Davis, he is voiced by Debi Derryberry since the test pilot premiered in 1998.

The character originated in the 1980s, created by Davis and series co-creator Keith Alcorn under the name of Johnny Quasar, and was developed in a 13-minute long short film pitched to SIGGRAPH sometime in 1997, and with production beginning in that year. However, since the name sounded similar to Jonny Quest, Davis brain-stormed various other monikers before coming up with the current name.  Characterized by his distinctive gravity-defying hairstyle and ridiculously high IQ of 210, Neutron is an aerospace engineer, physicist, astronaut/astronomer, biochemist, computer programmer, and architect. He is considered one of the most intelligent people in Retroville and possibly the show's universe. Throughout the series, he is often seen with his companion, a silver-gray robot dog named Goddard and a rocket ship nicknamed the Strato XL which he uses in the opening sequence, both of which he invented. Furthermore, Neutron has a perennial rivalry with Cindy Vortex, who calls him "Nerd-tron" throughout the show.

Role in The Adventures of Jimmy Neutron, Boy Genius 
Jimmy Neutron is an intelligent 11-year-old boy, lives in Retroville with his parents, Judy and Hugh, and his robot dog, Goddard. Jimmy's friends are overweight Carl Wheezer and hyperactive Sheen Estevez, and he has a long-standing rivalry with his intelligent classmate, Cindy Vortex. Though Vortex teases him, she often acts as a voice of reason when his inventions become too immoral or dangerous.

Character

Conception and creation

In the 1980s, Keith Alcorn and John A. Davis created the character, originally named Johnny Quasar (inspired by a facetious nickname that his Summer co-workers had coined for him in his youth), who builds a rocket ship and runs away from his parents. He later stumbled across the idea while moving into a new house in the early 1990s. He re-worked it as a short film titled Johnny Quasar and presented it at SIGGRAPH, where he met Steve Oedekerk and worked on a television series of the short as well as the movie. In fall 1995, the idea was pitched to Nickelodeon, who expressed immediate interest. Albie Hecht, the then-president of Nick, was particularly impressed- coining him to be "half Bart Simpson and half Albert Einstein," he strongly praised Johnny's blended personality as an adventurous and intelligent character and one grounded in the reality of childhood, which, according to him, made him "the perfect Nick kid." Following positive reception, Nickelodeon commissioned for a 13-minute pilot episode to be created. After several years of going through the review process, the episode began production in late 1997, and was completed in 1998. The name "Johnny Quasar" was changed at the request of Nickelodeon, who did not want the character to be confused with similarly-named ones such as Jonny Quest and Captain Quazar, so Davis brainstormed other character names while walking his dog around the neighborhood block, eventually coming up with the final name, "Jimmy Neutron."

Personality and abilities 
An extremely bright boy with an intelligence quotient of 210, he is defined as one of smartest people in the town of Retroville. Throughout the series, as explained in the theme song, he is described being “a kid with a knack for inventions.” Despite this quote, said inventions tend to go haywire, often as a result of both his pride and lack of common sense. Still being on that intellectual on a difficult situation, he experiences extreme brainstorms that he calls brain blasts.

Portrayal 

Jimmy Neutron is portrayed by voice actor Debi Derryberry, in TV series and film. Neutron was Derryberry's largest acting role at the time, as previously she had provided minor roles in films and TV shows. This is the second Nickelodeon character she voiced after Weenie from Oswald.

References

External links
 Jimmy’s profile at Nick.com

Television characters introduced in 1998
Animated characters introduced in 1998
Fictional roboticists
Fictional mechanics
Fictional inventors
Fictional characters from Texas
Animated human characters
Male characters in film
Male characters in animation
Child characters in animated films
Child characters in television
Animated characters
Fictional child prodigies
Jimmy Neutron characters
Male characters in animated series
Male characters in animated films